The Baltic Exchange bombing was an attack by the Provisional IRA on the City of London, Britain's financial centre, on 10 April 1992, the day after the General Election which re-elected John Major from the Conservative Party as Prime Minister. The bombing killed three people, injured 91 others, and severely damaged the Baltic Exchange and its surroundings.

Background
Since the Provisional Irish Republican Army's campaign in the early 1970s, many commercial targets were attacked in England which would cause economic damage and severe disruption. Since 1988, Gerry Adams of Sinn Féin and John Hume of the Social Democratic and Labour Party had been engaged in private dialogue to create a broad Irish nationalist coalition. British Prime Minister John Major had refused to openly enter into talks with Sinn Féin until the IRA declared a ceasefire. The risk of an IRA attack on the City of London had increased due to the lack of progress with political talks, resulting in a warning being circulated to all police forces in Britain highlighting intelligence reports of a possible attack, as it was felt the IRA had enough personnel, equipment and funds to launch a sustained campaign in England. Major won the General Election on 9 April 1992. The next day, the bombing occurred.

Bombing

On 10 April 1992 at 9:20 pm, a huge bomb was detonated in front of the Baltic Exchange building at 24–28 St Mary Axe. The façade of the offices was partially destroyed, and the rest of the building was extensively damaged. The bomb also caused heavy damage to surrounding buildings. It caused £800 million worth of damage (the equivalent of £ million in ), £200 million more than the total damage caused by the 10,000 explosions that had occurred during the Troubles in Northern Ireland up to that point.

The IRA gave a telephone warning twenty minutes before the explosion, saying there was a bomb inside a van outside the Stock Exchange. This is half a mile away from the actual location by the Baltic Exchange.

The homemade explosive was inside a white Ford Transit van parked in St Mary Axe. The components including the Libya-supplied Semtex were developed in South Armagh, shipped from Ireland, and assembled in England. The attack was planned for months and marked an advance to the British of the IRA's explosives manufacture. The bomb was described as the most powerful to hit London since the Luftwaffe raids of World War II.

A few hours later another similarly large bomb went off in Staples Corner in north London, also causing major damage.

Victims
The bomb attack killed three people: Paul Butt, aged 29, who was passing in the street; Thomas Casey, 49, a Baltic Exchange attendant; and 15-year-old Danielle Carter, who was waiting in a car in St Mary Axe (the London street). Another 91 people were injured.

Aftermath
The next day, the IRA claimed responsibility in a statement from Dublin. It is believed the IRA were trying to send a message to the Conservative Party who won the election, which also saw Sinn Féin leader Gerry Adams lose his unused seat in the Westminster Parliament.

On 14 July 1992 anti-terrorist detectives believed they might have identified the bombers.

Many of the damaged buildings were once again badly damaged by the 1993 Bishopsgate bombing the following year – both incidents contributed to the formation of the Traffic and Environmental Zone, the "Ring of Steel", in the City to protect it from further terrorism.

The Exchange sold its badly damaged historic building to be redeveloped under the auspices of English Heritage as a Grade II* site. However, the City and English Heritage later allowed it to be demolished, seeking instead a new landmark tall building. The site, together with that of the Chamber of Shipping at 30–32 St Mary Axe, is now home to the skyscraper commissioned by Swiss Re commonly referred to as The Gherkin.

The stained glass windows of First World war memorial in the Baltic Exchange suffered damage in the bomb blast; they have been restored and are housed in the National Maritime Museum.

See also
Bishopsgate bombing
1992 Staples Corner bombing
1992 London Bridge bombing
1992 Manchester bombing
1996 Manchester bombing
Stoke Newington Road lorry bomb
Provisional Irish Republican Army campaign 1969–1997

References

1992 crimes in the United Kingdom
1992 in London
1992 murders in the United Kingdom
1990s murders in London
Explosions in 1992
Attacks on buildings and structures in 1992
Attacks on buildings and structures in London
Provisional IRA bombings in London
April 1992 events in the United Kingdom
April 1992 crimes
Terrorist incidents in the United Kingdom in 1992
Terrorist incidents in London in the 1990s
Building bombings in London
Car and truck bombings in London